Lü Fan (born November 1956) is a Chinese diplomat who served as Chinese Ambassador to Chile from 2009 to 2012, and  and Spain from 2014 to 2019.

Biography
Lü was born in Heilongjiang, in November 1956. He joined the foreign service in 1979 and has served primarily in Spain. In December 2009, he was appointed to replace  as Chinese Ambassador to Chile.

Personal life 
Lü is married and has a son.

References

1956 births
Living people
People from Heilongjiang
Ambassadors of China to Chile
Ambassadors of China to Spain
Ambassadors of China to Andorra
Diplomats of the People's Republic of China